Lanphamda Ibeni (English: Ibeni in Warfield) is a 2012 Indian Meitei language film directed by Romi Meitei and produced by Bandana Maisnam under the banner of Bandana Films. It stars  Manda Leima and Hamom Sadananda in the lead roles. The film was theatrically released at Friends' Talkies and many other cinema halls of Manipur in 2012. Lanphamda Ibeni is based on Kunjalal Yendrembam's radio play of the same title.

The film got selection at the 8th Manipur State Film Festival.

Synopsis
The film tells the story of Ibeni, an ill-fated lady. She fights for survival but uses illegal means. She involves herself in drug business, steals gold and other precious jewelleries from various people and runs away. All the money and stuffs she stole are used for her children's education and welfare. At a time when her daughter completes the MBBS course and her son tops board exam, she gets caught by a police team during her last consignment related to drugs. This time, she does not run away but accepts her wrongdoings.

Cast
 Manda Leima as Ibeni
 Hamom Sadananda as Ibeni's husband
 Raju Nong as High Court Judge
 Huirem Seema as Judge's wife
 Gurumayum Priyogopal as Ibeni's father
 Bimola as Ibeni's mother
 Shoibam Italy as Police officer
 Heisnam Geeta
 Bala Hijam (Cameo appearance)
 Gokul Athokpam (Cameo appearance)

Soundtrack
Sorri Senjam composed the soundtrack for the film. There are two songs in the movie. The songs are titled Maibemma (opening song) and Hangla Atiyada.

References

External links
 Lanphamda Ibeni on KLMDb

2010s Meitei-language films
2012 films
Cinema of Manipur